Abu Ali Lawik of the Lawik dynasty was the son of Abu Bakr Lawik, and also a brother-in-law of the Turk Shahi ruler of the region, Kabul Shah.
He was invited by the people of Ghazni to overthrow Böritigin or Pirai and proceeded in alliance with the Shahi Rulers of the region in this venture. 

Alptigin seized Zabulistan together with its capital Ghazni from Amir Abu Bakr Lawik in c. AD 963, and there established an independent kingdom. He raised Sabuktigin to the position of a general.  Sabuktigin had been purchased as a slave by Alptigin who was the lord chamberlain of the Samani ruler of Khurasan.

See also
Zabulistan
Zunbils

References

10th-century Afghan people
History of Zabul Province
Kabul Shahi